Psychometry (from Greek: ψυχή, psukhē, "spirit, soul" and μέτρον, metron, "measure"), also known as token-object reading, or psychoscopy, is a form of extrasensory perception characterized by the claimed ability to make relevant associations from an object of unknown history by making physical contact with that object. Supporters assert that an object may have an energy field that transfers knowledge regarding that object's history.

There is no scientific evidence that psychometry exists and the concept has been widely criticized.

History 

Joseph Rodes Buchanan coined the word "psychometry" (measuring the soul) in 1842. Buchanan developed the idea that all things give off an emanation.

The Past is entombed in the Present! The world is its own enduring monument; and that which is true of its physical, is likewise true of its mental career. The discoveries of Psychometry will enable us to explore the history of man, as those of geology enable us to explore the history of the earth. There are mental fossils for psychologists as well as mineral fossils for the geologists; and I believe that hereafter the psychologist and the geologist will go hand in hand — the one portraying the earth, its animals and its vegetation, while the other portrays the human beings who have roamed over its surface in the shadows, and the darkness of primeval barbarism! Aye, the mental telescope is now discovered which may pierce the depths of the past and bring us in full view of the grand and tragic passages of ancient history!

Buchanan asserted that his particular psychism would supersede empiric science. He wrote a comprehensive treatise, Manual of Psychometry: the Dawn of a New Civilization (1885),  detailing how the direct knowledge of psychometry would be applied to and affect the many various branches of science. It also would elevate the various schools of philosophy and arts thereby affecting wide social change and ultimately an enlightenment of humanity:

The thermometer measures caloric (thermo temperature). The barometer measures the weight (baro, weight) of the atmosphere; the electrometer measures electric conditions; the psychometer measures the soul (psyche). In the case of Psychometry, however, the measuring assumes a new character, as the object measured and the measuring instrument are the same psychic element, and its measuring power is not limited to the psychic as it was developed in the first experiments, but has appeared by successive investigation to manifest a wider and wider area of power, until it became apparent that this psychic capacity was really the measure of all things in the Universe.

Buchanan continued to promote psychometry throughout his life and his followers believed that it would revolutionize science in a comprehensive way as "the dawn of a new civilization". Buchanan's work on psychometry was continued by the geologist William Denton (1823–1883). In 1863, Denton published a book on the subject The Soul of Things. Their work was criticized by Joseph Jastrow as based on delusion and wishful thinking.

Others, such as Stephen Pearl Andrews who promoted Psychometry along with his own new science of Universology, built upon Buchanan's ideas. As a lecturer Andrews asserted that such inquiries, as paraphrased by an 1878 New York Times article, "demonstrated that the sympathy between the mind and body is an exact science".

In the later nineteenth century demonstrations of psychometry became a popular part of stage acts and séances, with participants providing a personal object for "reading" by a medium or psychic. It is also commonly offered at psychic fairs as a type of psychic reading. At New Age events psychometry has claimed to help visitors "meet the dearly departed" (a form of spiritualism).

Scientific reception

There is no scientific evidence that psychometry exists. Skeptics explain alleged successes of psychometry by cold reading and confirmation bias.
Skeptic Robert Todd Carroll describes psychometry as a pseudoscience.

The majority of police departments polled do not use psychics and do not consider them credible or useful on cases. Proponents of psychometry have argued that psychic detectives have been used by law enforcement agencies on specific cases. However, psychologist Leonard Zusne has noted that "enquiries with police officials... reveal that the involvement of psychics has not been very helpful, and that second-hand reports of it are often in gross error."

See also

 Law of contagion
 List of parapsychology topics
 Parapsychology
 Retrocognition
 Precognition
 List of topics characterized as pseudoscience
 Discernment of Spirits

References

Further reading 
 Joseph Rodes Buchanan (1893). Manual of Psychometry: The Dawn of a New Civilization. Boston: F. H. Hodges.
 William Denton (1863). The Soul of Things, Or, Psychometric Researches and Discoveries. Boston: Walker, Wise & Co.
 Joe Nickell (1994). Psychic Sleuths: ESP and Sensational Cases. Prometheus Books. 
 James Randi (1982). Flim-Flam! Psychics, ESP, Unicorns, and Other Delusions. Prometheus Books. 
 Colin Wilson. (1985). The Psychic Detectives: The Story of Psychometry and Paranormal Crime Detection. Mercury House. 
 Richard Wiseman (2011). Paranormality: Why We See What Isn't There. Macmillan.

External links

 Psychometry Experiment, a project that gave residents in Ontario, Canada the opportunity to participate in a psychometry study
 Psychometry – Skeptic's Dictionary

Paranormal terminology
Pseudoscience
Psychic powers
Spiritualism
Parapsychology
New Age practices
Magic (supernatural)